Harold in the Land of Jazz (also released as Grooveyard) is the debut studio album by saxophonist Harold Land recorded in 1958 and released on the Contemporary label.

Background
Land's band on the album included jazz pianist Carl Perkins (not to be confused with the American Rockabilly singer and songwriter of the same name) in one of his final appearances on record. Perkins died two months after the recording session. The original LP cover showed Land playing his saxophone in front of the Watts Towers, which at the time had been condemned by the City of Los Angeles and were in danger of being destroyed.

Reception

The Allmusic review by Scott Yanow states: "Land shows that hard bop was very much alive in Los Angeles in the late '50s. His tone is cooler and softer than it would become later on, but it was already pretty distinctive".

Track listing
All compositions by Harold Land except as indicated
 "Speak Low" (Kurt Weill, Ogden Nash) - 5:35
 "Delirium" - 6:40
 "You Don't Know What Love Is" (Gene de Paul, Don Raye) - 3:55
 "Nieta" (Elmo Hope) - 4:35
 "Grooveyard" (Carl Perkins) - 7:02
 "Lydia's Lament" - 5:46
 "Smack Up" - 7:11
 "Promised Land" - 6:27 Bonus track on CD reissue

Personnel
Harold Land - tenor saxophone 
Rolf Ericson - trumpet
Carl Perkins - piano
Leroy Vinnegar - bass
Frank Butler - drums

References

 

Contemporary Records albums
Harold Land albums
1958 albums